Mehdiabad (also Romanized as Mehdīābād) is a village in Vardasht Rural District, in the Central District of Semirom County, Isfahan Province, Iran. At the 2006 census, its population was 104, in 27 families.

References 

Populated places in Semirom County